The 1996 United States Open Cup was the 83rd edition of the tournament, and the first Open Cup to include Major League Soccer teams.

D.C. United defeated the Rochester Raging Rhinos 3–0 in the final at RFK Stadium, Washington, D.C.

Originally, four of the ten MLS teams entered the tournament. Five ended up participating, as D.C. United replaced the Los Angeles Galaxy (due to the Galaxy's congested schedule), and the Colorado Rapids replaced the Colorado Foxes (when the team could not reschedule its third-round match against Kansas City). The A-League Rochester side beat two MLS teams en route to the final before falling to already-crowned MLS Cup champion United.

Bracket

First Round

Second Round

Quarterfinals

Note: The Colorado Rapids replaced the Colorado Foxes when the team could not reschedule its Quarterfinal match after player availability conflicts due to CONCACAF World Cup Qualifying.

Semifinals

Final

See Also
1996 National Amateur Cup

External links
 1996 U.S. Open Cup results

U.S. Open Cup
Cup